The Academy of Information Technology and Engineering (AITE) is a college preparatory, inter-district public magnet high school based in Stamford, Connecticut. AITE serves the Connecticut communities of Stamford, Darien, Greenwich, Norwalk, New Canaan, Redding, Ridgefield, Wilton and Weston.

See also 
Stamford, Connecticut
Education in Stamford, Connecticut

References

External links

Stamford Public Schools

Education in Stamford, Connecticut
Schools in Fairfield County, Connecticut
Educational institutions established in 1999
Public high schools in Connecticut
Magnet schools in Connecticut
1999 establishments in Connecticut